The 2019 Men's Asian Individual Squash Championships is the men's edition of the 2019 Asian Individual Squash Championships, which serves as the individual Asian championship for squash players. The event took place at National Squash Centre in Kuala Lumpur from 1 to 5 May 2019.

Seeds

  Saurav Ghosal (champion)
  Yip Tsz Fung (semifinals)
  Max Lee (quarterfinals)
  Leo Au (final)
  Abdulla Al-Tamimi (quarterfinals)
  Mohd Nafiizwan Adnan (quarterfinals)
  Ng Eain Yow (semifinals)
  Ivan Yuen (quarterfinals)

  Tayyab Aslam (third round)
  Henry Leung (second round)
  Asim Khan (third round)
  Mohd Syafiq Kamal (third round)
  Addeen Idrakie (second round)
  Ammar Al-Tamimi (third round)
  Sajjad Zareeian (third round)
  Tomotaka Endo (third round)

Draw and results

Finals

Top half

Section 1

Section 2

Bottom half

Section 3

Section 4

See also
2019 Women's Asian Individual Squash Championships
Asian Individual Squash Championships

References

2019 in squash
Squash in Asia
International sports competitions hosted by Malaysia
Squash tournaments in Malaysia
2019 in Malaysian sport
May 2019 sports events in Malaysia